Jason Renyt Tyner (born April 23, 1977) is a former Major League Baseball outfielder. His MLB career spanned nine seasons from 2000 through 2008 for the New York Mets (2000), Tampa Bay Devil Rays (2000-2003), Minnesota Twins (2005-2007), and Cleveland Indians (2008). He bats and throws left-handed and played all three outfield spots, with the majority of his playing time coming in left field.

College and high school
Tyner attended West Brook Senior High School in Beaumont, where he was named Beaumont Student Athlete of the Year and was a member of the National Honor Society as a junior and senior. Following high school, he attended Texas A&M University, graduating in 1998. He finished his collegiate career first on A&M's all-time list for hits and stolen bases, was second in batting average, and third in at-bats. Making the feat even more remarkable was that he set the records in only three seasons.

New York Mets 
After three years at Texas A&M, Tyner was the New York Mets' first round draft pick, and twenty-first overall pick in the 1998 Major League Baseball Draft. The outfielder rose quickly through the Mets' minor league system, making his major league debut on June 5, .

Tampa Bay Devil Rays 
On July 28, 2000 Tyner's stint in New York ended quickly though, as he was dealt to the Tampa Bay Devil Rays along with pitcher Paul Wilson for pitcher Rick White and outfielder Bubba Trammell.

In , he established himself as a good baserunner, collecting a then club record and personal career best 31 stolen bases. His bat, however, was not nearly as quick as his feet. He hit .280 with 111 hits, only 13 of which went for extra bases. These numbers along with 105 games, 396 at-bats, and 21 RBI are all career highs.

He was the final out of Derek Lowe's no-hitter in April 2002.

Tyner was noted for a failed promotional giveaway by the Devil Rays. The ballclub had arranged to honor him by presenting his bobblehead to the first 10,000 fans attending a game versus the Oakland Athletics at Tropicana Field on June 2, 2002. The bobbleheads were never distributed because he had been demoted to the Durham Bulls five days prior on May 28. After sitting in storage for a while, they were given to the Pinellas County Education Foundation, who distributed them students in their business and commerce program.

Texas Rangers 
On December 8, 2003, he was claimed off waivers by the Texas Rangers. The Rangers released him in April .

Atlanta Braves 
Tyner signed with the Atlanta Braves as a free agent. The Braves released him in July 2004.

Cleveland Indians 
Tyner again found a home, this time with the Cleveland Indians. Tyner failed to make the majors with either Texas, Atlanta, or Cleveland.

Minnesota Twins 
He resurfaced with the Minnesota Twins in late 2004. After a solid  season with the Twins' Triple-A affiliate, the Rochester Red Wings, Tyner made it back to the big leagues as a September call-up collecting 18 hits in 56 at-bats. He signed another minor league deal with Minnesota on October 14. His scrappy play, swift speed, and small ball mentality fit well with much of the Twins' mantra.

Nicknamed "The Piranhas" by Chicago White Sox manager Ozzie Guillén, the Twins came to embrace the term as affirmation of their selfless, aggressive play. None of the original "piranhas" are still with the Twins. Formerly, Luis Castillo, who was traded to the New York Mets on July 30, Jason Bartlett, who was traded to the Tampa Bay Rays in late November 2007, and Nick Punto who left for the St. Louis Cardinals via free agency in 2011, were also known by that nickname.

Cleveland Indians Again 
On February 21, Tyner signed a minor league deal with the Cleveland Indians. On May 11, Tyner's contract was bought from the Triple-A Buffalo Bisons by the Indians. Five days later, on May 16, Cleveland designated Tyner for assignment. The Indians released him on July 25.

Chicago White Sox 
Tyner signed with the Chicago White Sox. He became a free agent at the end of the 2008 season

Houston Astros 
Tyner signed a minor league contract with the Houston Astros in January . He was released during spring training.

Milwaukee Brewers 
Tyner signed a minor league contract with the Milwaukee Brewers in March 2009.

Detroit Tigers 
On April 22, 2009 Tyner was traded to the Detroit Tigers. The Tigers released Tyner on June 17, 2009.

The home run drought
Prior to 2004, Tyner had a severe home run drought until he hit one in a minor league game in Richmond in 2004.

Tyner finally hit his first (and only) major league home run against the Cleveland Indians on July 28, 2007, against Jake Westbrook. This home run came after 1,220 major league at bats in 390 career games and traveled 352 feet. At the time, Tyner had the longest home run drought in the major leagues. When he hit the home run, ex-teammate Luis Castillo took over the major league lead for a home run drought, not having hit one in 612 at-bats.

Of MLB players who made their debut in 2000 or later, Tyner has the most at bats with exactly 1 career home run.

Personal life
Tyner is married to his high school sweetheart, Annie. The couple have three daughters; Payton, Presley and Parker. They also have a son, Reid.

He awards $1,500 scholarships to southeast Texas scholar-athletes under the Juliet Tyner Memorial Scholarship Foundation. The foundation was created in honor of his mother, who died from breast cancer in 1998.

Along with former Pittsburgh Pirates minor leaguer Morgan Walker, Tyner operates the Southeast Texas Baseball Academy, which runs baseball programs for 8–12-year-olds.

References

External links

1977 births
Living people
Baseball players from Texas
Major League Baseball outfielders
New York Mets players
Tampa Bay Devil Rays players
Minnesota Twins players
Cleveland Indians players
Sportspeople from Beaumont, Texas
Texas A&M Aggies baseball players
St. Lucie Mets players
Binghamton Mets players
Norfolk Tides players
Durham Bulls players
Buffalo Bisons (minor league) players
Richmond Braves players
Rochester Red Wings players
Charlotte Knights players
Toledo Mud Hens players
Nashville Sounds players